Gyöngyösoroszi is a village in Heves county, Hungary.

References

External links 
   

Populated places in Heves County